Budian (also Romanized as Būdīān) is a village in Tulem Rural District, Tulem District, Sowme'eh Sara County, Gilan Province, Iran. At the 2006 census, its population was 237, in 61 families.

References 

Populated places in Sowme'eh Sara County